ESPN (originally an initialism for Entertainment and Sports Programming Network) is an American international basic cable sports channel owned by ESPN Inc., owned jointly by The Walt Disney Company (80%) and Hearst Communications (20%). The company was founded in 1979 by Bill Rasmussen along with his son Scott Rasmussen and Ed Eagan.

ESPN broadcasts primarily from studio facilities located in Bristol, Connecticut. The network also operates offices and auxiliary studios in Miami, New York City, Las Vegas, Seattle, Charlotte, Washington, D.C., and Los Angeles. James Pitaro currently serves as chairman of ESPN, a position he has held since March 5, 2018, following the resignation of John Skipper on December 18, 2017. While ESPN is one of the most successful sports networks, there has been criticism of ESPN. This includes accusations of biased coverage, conflict of interest, and controversies with individual broadcasters and analysts.

, ESPN reaches approximately 76 million television households in the United States—a drop of 24% from nearly a decade ago.

In addition to the flagship channel and its seven related channels in the United States, ESPN broadcasts in more than 200 countries. It operates regional channels in Africa, Australia, Latin America and the Netherlands. In Canada, it owns a 20% interest in The Sports Network (TSN) and its five sister networks.

History

Bill Rasmussen came up with the concept of ESPN in May 1978, after he was fired from his job with the World Hockey Association's New England Whalers. Bill and his son Scott (who had also been let go by the Whalers)  first rented office space in Plainville, Connecticut. However, the plan to base ESPN there was put on hold because of a local ordinance prohibiting buildings from bearing rooftop satellite dishes. Available land to build their own facility on was quickly found in Bristol, Connecticut (where the channel remains headquartered to this day), with funding to buy the property provided by Getty Oil, which purchased 85% of the company from Bill Rasmussen on February 22, 1979, in an attempt to diversify the company's holdings. This helped the credibility of the fledgling company; however, there were still many doubters about the viability of their sports channel concept. Another event that helped build ESPN's credibility was securing an advertising agreement with Anheuser-Busch in the spring of 1979; the company invested $1 million to be the "exclusive beer advertised on the network."

ESPN launched on September 7, 1979, beginning with the first telecast of what would become the channel's flagship program, SportsCenter. Taped in front of a small live audience inside the Bristol studios, it was broadcast to 1.4 million cable subscribers throughout the United States.

ESPN's next big step forward came when the channel acquired the rights to broadcast coverage of the early rounds of the NCAA Division I men's basketball tournament. It first aired its games in March 1980, helping bring attention to what is today known as "March Madness." The channel's tournament coverage also launched the broadcasting career of Dick Vitale, who at the time he joined ESPN had just been fired as head coach of the Detroit Pistons.

In April of that year ESPN began televising the NFL Draft, bringing it also to a mass audience and over time creating a television “event“.  That same month the network began broadcasting Top Rank Boxing on ESPN, marking the beginning of its involvement with televised professional boxing. The show lasted 16 years, and ESPN has since shown boxing live intermittently with other shows including ESPN Friday Night Fights and others. For a period during the 1980s, the network had boxing tournaments, crowning champions in different boxing weight divisions as "ESPN champions".
 
The next major stepping stone for ESPN came throughout a couple of months in 1984. During this period, the American Broadcasting Company (ABC) purchased 100% of ESPN from the Rasmussens and Getty Oil. Under Getty ownership, the channel was unable to compete for the television rights to major sports events contracts as its majority corporate parent would not provide the funding, leading ESPN to lose out for broadcast deals with the National Hockey League (to USA Network) and NCAA Division I college football (to TBS). For years, the NFL, NBA, and Major League Baseball refused to consider cable as a means of broadcasting some of their games. However, with the backing of ABC, ESPN's ability to compete for major sports contracts greatly increased, and gave it credibility within the sports broadcasting industry.

Later that year, the U.S. Supreme Court ruled in NCAA v. Board of Regents of the University of Oklahoma (1984) that the NCAA could no longer monopolize the rights to negotiate the contracts for college football games, allowing each school to negotiate broadcast deals on their own. ESPN took full advantage and began to broadcast a large number of NCAA football games, creating an opportunity for fans to be able to view multiple games each weekend (instead of just one), the same deal that the NCAA had previously negotiated with TBS. ESPN's breakthrough moment occurred in 1987 when it secured a contract with the NFL to broadcast eight games during that year's regular season – all of which aired on Sunday nights, marking the first broadcasts of Sunday NFL primetime games. ESPN's Sunday Night Football games would become the highest-rated NFL telecasts for the next 17 years (before losing the rights to NBC in 2006). The channel's decision to broadcast NFL games on Sunday evenings resulted in a decline in viewership for the daytime games shown on the major broadcast networks, marking the first time that ESPN had been a legitimate competitor to NBC and CBS, which had long dominated the sports television market.

In 1992, ESPN launched ESPN Radio, a national sports talk radio network providing analysis and commentary programs (including shows such as Mike and Mike in the Morning and The Herd) as well as audio play-by-play of sporting events (including some simulcasted with the ESPN television channel).

On October 10, 1993, ESPN2 – a secondary channel that originally was programmed with a separate lineup of niche sports popular with males 18–49 years old (with snowboarding and the World Series of Poker as its headliners) as well as serving as an overflow channel for ESPN – launched on cable systems reaching to 10 million subscribers. It became the fastest-growing cable channel in the U.S. during the 1990s, eventually expanding its national reach to 75 million subscribers.

Ownership of ABC, and thus control of ESPN, was acquired by Capital Cities Communications in 1985. ESPN's parent company renamed themselves as Capital Cities/ABC Inc. Capital Cities/ABC Inc. was then acquired by The Walt Disney Company in 1996 and was re-branded as Walt Disney Television.

Challenges began to appear in the 2000s. ESPN began to shed viewers, more than 10 million over a period of several years in the 2010s even while paying big money for the broadcast rights to such properties as the NFL, NBA and College Football Playoff. 

On April 26, 2017, approximately 100 ESPN employees were notified that their positions with the sports network had been terminated, among them athletes-turned-analysts Trent Dilfer and Danny Kanell, and noted journalists like NFL beat reporter Ed Werder and Major League Baseball expert Jayson Stark. Further cost-cutting measures taken included moving the studio operations of ESPNU to Bristol from Charlotte, North Carolina, reducing its longtime MLB studio show Baseball Tonight to Sundays as a lead-in to the primetime game and adding the MLB Network-produced Intentional Talk to ESPN2's daily lineup.

On April 12, 2018, ESPN began a supplemental over-the-top streaming service known as ESPN+.

After having last carried national-televised NHL games in 2004, ESPN and ABC agreed in March 2021 on a seven-year contract to televise games, with some airing on ESPN+ and Hulu. The contract also awarded four of the seven Stanley Cup Finals to both ESPN and ABC. All other nationally televised games will air on TBS and TNT under a separate deal the league struck with Turner Sports the following month.

Programming

Alongside its live sports broadcasts, ESPN also airs a variety of sports highlight, talk, and documentary-styled shows. These include:
 Around the Horn – Competitive debating between four sports writers across the country
 College GameDay (basketball) – Weekly college basketball show airing from the Saturday Primetime game of the week site
 College GameDay (football) – Weekly college football preview show airing from the site of a major college football game
 E:60 – An investigative newsmagazine program focusing on American and international sports
 First Take – A daily morning talk show with Stephen A. Smith and Molly Qerim (moved from ESPN2 on January 3, 2017)
 Get Up! – A daily morning show, focusing on the previous night's game results and the burning sports issues of the day
 Monday Night Countdown – Weekly recap show aired on Monday evenings during the NFL season, also serves as the pre-game show for Monday Night Football
 Pardon the Interruption – A daily afternoon talk show where Tony Kornheiser and Michael Wilbon debate an array of sports topics
 SportsCenter – The flagship program of ESPN, a daily sports news program delivering the latest sports news and highlights
 Sunday NFL Countdown – Weekly preview show that airs on Sunday mornings during the NFL season
 This Just In with Max Kellerman – A daily afternoon talk show with news, opinion, and analysis

Many of ESPN's documentary programs (such as 30 for 30 and Nine for IX) are produced by ESPN Films, a film division created in March 2008 as a restructuring of ESPN Original Entertainment, a programming division that was originally formed in 2001. 30 for 30 started airing in 2009 and continues airing to this day. Each episode is through the eyes of a well known filmmaker and has featured some of the biggest directors in Hollywood. The 30 for 30 film O.J.: Made in America won the Academy Award for Best Documentary Feature in 2017, the first such Oscar for ESPN.

Ultimate Fighting Championship signed a 5-year contract with ESPN starting 2019 on ESPN and ESPN+ which estimate every quarter 2 event on UFC on ESPN and 6 events on UFC Fight Night on ESPN+.

In March 2019, ESPN announced a new betting-themed daily program, Daily Wager, hosted by the network's gambling analyst Doug Kezirian. The program was ESPN's first regularly scheduled program solely dedicated to gaming-related content. On May 14, 2019, ESPN announced a deal with casino operator Caesars Entertainment to establish an ESPN-branded studio at The LINQ Hotel & Casino in Las Vegas to produce betting-themed content.
 
In order to help offset the impact of Covid-19 on its business, Walt Disney CEO Bob Chapek indicated during a 4th quarter fiscal year 2021 earnings conference that the company would increase its presence in online sports betting, including in partnership with third parties.

Related channels

ESPN on ABC

Since September 2006, ESPN has been integrated with the sports division of sister broadcast network ABC, with sports events televised on that network airing under the banner ESPN on ABC; much of ABC's sports coverage since the rebranding has become increasingly limited to secondary coverage of sporting events whose broadcast rights are held by ESPN (such as NBA games, NHL games, and the X Games and its related qualifying events) as well as a limited array of event coverage not broadcast on ESPN (most notably, the NBA Finals).

ESPN2

ESPN2 was launched on October 1, 1993. It carried a broad mix of event coverage from conventional sports—including auto racing, college basketball and NHL hockey—to extreme sports—such as BMX, skateboarding and motocross. The "ESPN BottomLine", a ticker displaying sports news and scores during all programming that is now used by all of ESPN's networks, originated on ESPN2 in 1995. In the late 1990s, ESPN2 was gradually reformatted to serve as a secondary outlet for ESPN's mainstream sports programming.

ESPN Classic

ESPNClassic is a subscription television network that launched in 1995 as Classic Sports Network, founded by Brian Bedol and Steve Greenberg. ESPN Inc. purchased Classic Sports Network in 1997 for $175 million, rebranding the channel to its current name the following year. The channel broadcasts notable archived sporting events (originally including events from past decades, but now focusing mainly on events from the 1990s and later), sports documentaries and sports-themed movies.

ESPNews

ESPNews is a subscription television network that was launched on November 1, 1996, originally focusing solely on sports news, highlight,s and press conferences. Since August 2010, the network has gradually incorporated encores of ESPN's various sports debate and entertainment shows and video simulcasts of ESPN Radio shows, in addition to sports news programming (which since the 2013 cancellation of Highlight Express, consists mainly of additional runs of SportsCenter); ESPNews also serves as an overflow feed due to programming conflicts caused by sporting events on the other ESPN networks.

ESPN DeportesESPN Deportes''' ("ESPN Sports") is a subscription television network that was originally launched in July 2001 to provide Spanish simulcasts of certain Major League Baseball telecasts from ESPN. It became a 24-hour sports channel in January 2004.

ESPNUESPNU is a subscription television network that launched on March 4, 2005, and focuses on college athletics including basketball, football, baseball, college swimming, and ice hockey.

Longhorn Network

The LonghornNetwork is a subscription television network that was launched on August 26, 2011, focusing on events from the Texas Longhorns varsity sports teams of the University of Texas at Austin. It features events from the 20 sports sanctioned by the Texas Longhorns athletics department, along with original programming (including historical, academic and cultural content).

SEC NetworkSECNetwork is a subscription television network that launched on August 14, 2014, focusing on the coverage of sporting events sanctioned by the Southeastern Conference. Created as a result of a 20-year broadcast partnership between the two entities, the network is a joint venture between the conference and ESPN Inc. (which operates the network).

ACC Network

Launching on August 22, 2019, the ACCNetwork is a subscription television networkthath focuses on the sporting events of the Atlantic Coast Conference as part of a current agreement extending to the 2036–37 academic term as a joint venture of network operator ESPN Inc. and the ACC.

Other services
ESPN HDD

ESPN launched it's high definition simulcast feed, originally branded as ESPNHD', on March 30, 2003, with a broadcast of the Texas Rangers and the Los Angeles Angels (then the Anaheim Angels). All studio shows based in Bristol and at L. A. Live, along with most live event telecasts on ESPN, are broadcast in high definition. ESPN is one of the few television networks with an all-digital infrastructure. Archived non-HD programming is presented in 4:3 standard definition with stylized pillarboxing. Pardon the Interruption and Around the Horn began airing in HD on September 27, 2010, with the relocation of the production of both shows into the facility housing the Washington, D.C. bureau for ABC News.

ESPN, as with Disney/ABC's other television networks, broadcasts HD programming in the 720p resolution format; this because ABC executives had proposed a progressive scan signal that resolves fluid and high-speed motion in sports better, particularly during slow-motion replays. The network's Digital Center itself natively holds 2160p UHD/4K operations and equipment. In 2011, ESPNHD began to downplay its distinct promotional logo in preparation for the conversion of its standard definition feed from a 4:3 full-screen to a letterboxed format (via the application of the AFD #10 display flag), which occurred on June 1 of that year.

 WatchESPN

WatchESPN was a website for desktop computers, as well as an application for smartphones and tablet computers that allows subscribers of participating pay-TV providers to watch live streams of programming from ESPN and its sister networks except for ESPN Classic), including most sporting events, on computers, mobile devices, Apple TV, Roku and Xbox Live via their TV Everywhere login provided by their cable provider. The service originally launched on October 25, 2010, as ESPN Networks, a streaming service that provided a live stream of ESPN exclusive to Time Warner Cable subscribers. ESPN3, an online streaming service providing live streams and replays of global sports events that launched in 2005 as a separate website, was incorporated into the WatchESPN platform on August 31, 2011. Likewise, ESPN+ was launched in April 2018 as an add-on subscription for $4.99 per month. On June 1, 2019, WatchESPN was discontinued the service's full merger into the ESPN app.

 ESPN Events

ESPN Regional Television (formerly branded as ESPN Plus) is the network's syndication arm, which produces collegiate sporting events for free-to-air television stations throughout the United States (primarily those affiliated with networks such as The CW and MyNetworkTV or independent stations). ESPN Plus syndicates college football and basketball games from the American Athletic Conference, Big 12 Conference, Mid-American Conference, Metro Atlantic Athletic Conference, Sun Belt Conference and the Western Athletic Conference.

 ESPN on Snapchat

ESPN distributes various content on Snapchat Discover, including a Snapchat-only version of SportsCenter.

 ESPN MVP

ESPN MVP (initially known as Mobile ESPN) was a 2005 attempt at having ESPN operate a mobile virtual network operator with exclusive mobile content, first as a feature phone, then after ESPN MVP's termination into a Verizon Wireless paid service. Technologies developed for it have since been transferred to the network's successful mobile strategy in the smartphone era. 

International channels

ESPN owns and operates regional channels in Brazil, Caribbean, Latin America, Netherlands, Oceania and Sub-Saharan Africa. In Canada, ESPN is a minority owner of The Sports Network (TSN) and the French-language Réseau des sports (RDS). ESPN also has a minority stake in J Sports in Japan.

In popular culture

As it grew in popularity ESPN became a part of popular culture. Many movies with a general sports theme will include ESPN announcers and programming their storylines.

Many jokes have been made by comedians about fake obscure sports that are shown on ESPN. Dennis Miller mentioned watching "sumo rodeo," while George Carlin stated that ESPN showed "Australian dick wrestling." One of several Saturday Night Live sketches poking fun at the network features a fictional ESPN2 program called Scottish Soccer Hooligan Weekly, which includes a fake advertisement for "Senior Women's Beach Lacrosse."

Criticism

ESPN has been criticized for focusing too much on men's college and professional sports, and very little on women's sports or other extreme sports. Baseball, ice hockey, and soccer fans have also criticized ESPN for not giving their respective sports more coverage. Other criticism has focused on ethnicity in ESPN's varying mediated forms, as well as carriage fees and issues regarding the exportation of ESPN content. Some critics argue that ESPN's success is their ability to provide other enterprise and investigative sports news while competing with other hard sports-news-producing outlets such as Yahoo! Sports and Fox Sports. Some scholars have challenged ESPN's journalistic integrity, calling for an expanded standard of professionalism to prevent biased coverage and conflicts of interest.

On October 8, 2019, Deadspin'' reported that an internal memo was sent to ESPN employees instructing them to avoid any political discussions regarding the People's Republic of China and Hong Kong in the aftermath of a tweet by Rockets general manager Daryl Morey.

Awards 

 National Hispanic Media Coalition's "Outstanding Commitment and Outreach to the Latino Community", 2016

ESPN has now won 232 Sports Emmy Awards in 35 years of eligibility

See also
 List of ESPN personalities
 List of past ESPN personalities
 ESPN 3D
 ESPN+
 Maxx Zoom
 Wieden+Kennedy

References

Bibliography

External links
 

 
Bristol, Connecticut
ESPN media outlets
Disney television networks
1996 mergers and acquisitions
Television networks in the United States
Sports television networks in the United States
Television channels and stations established in 1979
The Walt Disney Company subsidiaries
Webby Award winners
Peabody Award winners
1979 establishments in Connecticut